Luke Jordan (January 28, 1892 or November 1893 – June 25, 1952) was an American blues guitarist and vocalist of some renown, particularly in the area of his home, in Lynchburg, Virginia.

Biography

Sources conflict on Jordan's birthplace. Some sources list his birthplace as Appomattox County, Virginia, or Bluefield, West Virginia. According to his World War I draft registration card, Jordan was born in Lynchburg, Virginia. At the time of his registration on June 5, 1917, he was living in Bluefield and worked as a delivery boy and janitor. Jordan's gravestone mentions that he served in the "7th Development Battalion" during the war.

His professional career started at age 35, when he was noticed by Victor Records. He went to Charlotte, North Carolina in 1927 and made several records. The records sold moderately well, and Victor decided to take Jordan to New York in 1929 for two more sessions. He recorded few known tracks in his career. In comparison with the harsh voices of many contemporary Delta blues musicians, Jordan sang in a smooth and relaxed tenor. During the Great Depression, Jordan stayed in Lynchburg, and was often found playing by the local shoe factory. By the 1940s, Jordan had lost his voice, and had stopped singing.

According to a second draft registration card filled out on April 27, 1942 for World War II, Jordan was living in Lynchburg, and was unemployed. Jordan was known in his early years to be a cocaine addict, and in later life as a heavy alcoholic who was unable to hold down steady employment.

He died in Lynchburg in June 1952. His gravestone lies at Forest Hill Burial Park, in Lynchburg, Virginia.

His song "Church Bells Blues" was later recorded by Ralph Willis. It was also recorded by David Bromberg as a medley with Blind Willie McTell's "Statesboro Blues".

Known recordings

Recorded August 16, 1927, Charlotte, North Carolina
 39819-1. "Church Bells Blues." Victor unissued
 39819-2. "Church Bells Blues." Vi 21076
 39820-1. "Pick Poor Robin Clean." Victor unissued
 39820-2. "Pick Poor Robin Clean." Vi 20957
 39821-2. "Cocaine Blues." Vi 21076
 39822-1. "Traveling Coon." Vi 20957

Recorded November 18, 1929, New York City
 57703-1. "My Gal's Done Quit Me." Vi V38564
 57704-3. "Won't You Be Kind?" Vi V38564

Recorded November 19, 1929, New York City
 57705- . "If I Call You Mama." Vi 23400
 57706-2. "Look Up, Look Down." Victor unissued
 57707- . "Tom Brown Sits in His Prison Cell." Vi 23400
 57708-2. "That's a Plenty." Victor unissued

References

1892 births
1952 deaths
American blues guitarists
American male guitarists
American blues singers
Songwriters from Virginia
Piedmont blues musicians
Musicians from Lynchburg, Virginia
20th-century American guitarists
African-American military personnel
Guitarists from Virginia
Victor Records artists
African-American male songwriters
African-American guitarists
20th-century African-American male singers